is a junction passenger railway station located in the city of Sakaide, Kagawa Prefecture, Japan. It is operated by JR Shikoku and has the station number "Y07".

Lines
Yasoba Station is served by the JR Shikoku Yosan Line and is located 18.6 km from the beginning of the line at Takamatsu. Only local services stop at the station. These trains also stop at Yasoba.

Layout
The station consists of two opposed side platforms serving two tracks. There is no station building but weather shelters are provided on both platforms for waiting passengers. The station is unstaffed but a "Tickets Corner" (small shelter housing an automatic ticket vending machine) is installed. Ramps lead up to each platform from the access road. There is no direct link between the platforms. A road level crossing at the end of the ramps is used to cross from one platform to the other. A designated parking space for bicycles is provided near the station.

Adjacent stations

History
Yasoba Station opened on 27 January 1952 as an additional stop on the existing Yosan Line. At this time the station was operated by Japanese National Railways (JNR). With the privatization of JNR on 1 April 1987, control of the station passed to JR Shikoku.

Surrounding area
Japan National Route 11

See also
 List of railway stations in Japan

References

External links

Station timetable 

Railway stations in Kagawa Prefecture
Railway stations in Japan opened in 1952
Sakaide, Kagawa